Sfard may refer to:

Places
ספרד, the Hebrew name for Spain
The name of the ancient city of Sardis in Lydian

People
Anna Sfard, daughter of Zygmunt Bauman
Michael Sfard, Israeli political activist